Liptovský Ján is a spa village and municipality in Liptovský Mikuláš District in the Žilina Region of northern Slovakia.

History 
The village was first mentioned in 1263 in historical records. Its traditional name was Sv. Ján, "St. John" (Latin: Sanctus Johannes, Hungarian: Sz.-János, later Szent-Ivány), after the local church. "Saint" was removed by the communist authorities in 1960.

Mineral and hot springs 
In the region is about 23 mineral springs, some of them are hot springs. The most popular is Teplica spring, also called Kaďa, it contains about 830 milligrams of sulfates per liter. Mineral waters are used for drinking and thermal water swimming pools are open to the public.

Geography 
The municipality lies at an altitude of 654 metres and covers an area of 67.774 km². It has a population of about 819.

References

External links 
 www.liptovskyjan.sk

Villages and municipalities in Liptovský Mikuláš District